Raşit Çetiner (born 10 September 1956) is a Turkish football coach and a former player of Galatasaray (1981–1988) and Fenerbahçe (1978–1981). He also played for Kocaelispor between 1974 and 1978. In 1978, when playing for Kocaelispor he became the top goal-scorer in TFF First League and awarded as the Player of the Year. In 1982 and 1985 he helped Galatasaray win the Turkish Cup. He retired in 1988 after sustaining a serious injury in a Galatasaray-Samsunspor match in 1986–87.

He also managed the Turkey U21 national team for many years. He resigned when his team fell to a 2–1 defeat against Kazakhstan and he was succeeded by Reha Kapsal.

Çetiner is married and has two sons named Erdim and Doruk.

Honours

Player
Galatasaray
 Turkish Super League: 1987, 1988
 Turkish Cup: 1982, 1985

Manager
Galatasaray
 Turkish Cup: 1991 (as assistant coach)

Bursaspor
 TFF First League: 2005

Turkey U21
 Participation in UEFA European Under-21 Football Championship: 2000 (First in Turkish football history)

References

External links
 
 
 

1956 births
Living people
Turkish footballers
Association football midfielders
Turkey international footballers
Turkey under-21 international footballers
Turkey youth international footballers
İstanbulspor footballers
Göztepe S.K. footballers
Kocaelispor footballers
Galatasaray S.K. footballers
Fenerbahçe S.K. footballers
Turkish football managers
Süper Lig managers
Beylerbeyi S.K. managers
Gaziantepspor managers
Denizlispor managers
Bursaspor managers
Çanakkale Dardanelspor managers
Antalyaspor managers
Altay S.K. managers